Richard Joseph Farley (born May 30, 1946) is a former American football player and coach and active track and field coach.  He served as the head football coach at Williams College from 1987 to 2003, compiling a record of 114–19–3.  Farley was inducted into the College Football Hall of Fame as a coach in 2006.

Playing career
Farley graduated from St. John's Preparatory School in 1964, where he played football and ran track. At Boston University he was an All-America defensive back and was captain of the football and track and field teams before graduating in 1968.  He spent two years playing for the San Diego Chargers of the American Football League before moving on to coaching.

Coaching career
Farley has coached at Williams College since 1972.  From 1972 to 1987, he was head coach of the track and field team.  In 1987, he gave up these duties to become head coach of the football team, a post he held for 17 years before moving back to coaching track and field full-time.  During that span, he recorded a career record of 114–19–3 (.849) that ranks as the eight best in college football history.  His teams regularly dominated the NESCAC and recorded five perfect seasons, including a 23-game winning streak that until 2005 was the longest in NCAA Division III history.

Farley is currently co-head coach of the men's and women's track and field teams at Williams.

Head coaching record

See also
 List of American Football League players

References

External links
 
 

1946 births
Living people
American football defensive backs
American Football League players
Boston University Terriers football players
San Diego Chargers players
Williams Ephs football coaches
College track and field coaches in the United States
College Football Hall of Fame inductees
People from Danvers, Massachusetts
Sportspeople from Essex County, Massachusetts
Coaches of American football from Massachusetts
Players of American football from Massachusetts